Civil War: Front Line is an 11-issue, limited series tie-in to Marvel Comics's Civil War event which started in August 2006.

Part of the story is told from the perspective of two reporters embedded in the opposite camps of the war. Ben Urich follows the stories on Iron Man's side with the pro-registration heroes, while Sally Floyd investigates the anti-registration faction headed by Captain America.  Writer Paul Jenkins was given carte blanche to have the stories reflect the current political landscape in the United States.

The other half of the series is told from the perspective of Speedball of the New Warriors. It shows Speedball's struggles with survivor guilt, imprisonment, and relations to the victims of the Stamford disaster.

Plot summary
Iron Man shows his support for the Superhuman Registration Act by agreeing to be interviewed by Ben Urich, while making the proposal for Sally Floyd to investigate the anti-registration faction, right after she has an awkward interview with Spider-Man.
Afterwards, Peter Parker reveals his identity as Spider-Man on a press conference.

Sally meets a group of unregistered heroes at a warehouse. They all wonder at the reasons for being persecuted. Later, Thunderclap is battling Bantam, the latter being pro-registration and determined to bring Thunderclap in. Bantam is knocked into a gas tank and killed in the following explosion, leaving a shocked Thunderclap behind. She-Hulk tries to help Robbie Baldwin aka Speedball negotiate a deal to get him out of jail. Robbie doesn't want to formally admit fault in any way. Meanwhile, a pet store owner is revealed to be a member of an Atlantean sleeper cell.

Sally Floyd meets the unregistered heroes again, but their meeting is cut short when Iron Man and his troops storm in to apprehend the heroes. Sally manages to get away before being seen. Meanwhile, Ben Urich is following a lead which turns out to be trap set by the Green Goblin, Norman Osborn, who threatens him. Robbie Baldwin is attacked in prison, which causes his dormant powers to restart. He is then visited by his mother, who cuts all ties with him.

Ben Urich investigates the Green Goblin, who should be in prison. Meanwhile, Speedball is transferred to "Negative Zone Prison Alpha" along with other unregistered heroes and villains.

Ben Urich is quitting his job at the Daily Bugle, after his encounter with the Green Goblin is doubted. He agrees to do one last assignment, accompanying the pro-reg heroes to a fight against Captain America's anti-registration group. Ben is shocked when Thor (actually a cloned cyborg version created by the pro-registration faction) kills Goliath, and is further disturbed by the use of super villains in the conflict. Speedball agrees to speak at a public hearing, but is shot by a man in the crowd. The Atlantean sleeper agent meets up with several armed comrades, but doesn't noticed he is trailed by Wonder Man.

In Robbie Baldwin's ambulance, his powers spontaneously manifest again as he goes into shock, blowing the ambulance's engine and causing it to crash. The police finds the Atlantean sleeper agents, all dead, along with an unconscious Wonder Man. After waking, he claims that the Green Goblin is responsible.

Ben Urich's technology expert friend Dan believes that Tony Stark may be manipulating the events of the Civil War to make money. Sally Floyd is covertly escorted to the meeting place of Captain America's forces. A later peace conference with Atlanteans goes badly when Norman Osborn attacks the visitors. He claims he was under control of an outside force.

Sally Floyd meets up with Captain America to interview him and declares that he is misguided in his view of the Civil War. Ben and Peter Parker hack into the computers of Tony Stark's accounting firm to discover that Tony Stark has used inside information to manipulate the stock market for personal gain. Reed Richards confirms that the nanites in Osborn's blood that were supposed to keep him in check were altered. Richard  concludes that there is a traitor and Tony Stark admits that there is and he has known it all along. Speedball is used as a hostage during a prison break, but the plan fails when he regains his powers. Norman Osborn is interrogated by two homicide detectives but before they can get anything out of him, a shadowy figure arrives with a document that makes Osborn's case a matter of National Security.

Ben Urich finally resigns from the Daily Bugle because he knows they won't print what he's discovered. The newly released Speedball meets with a costume maker, who  says he can see it used for no means less than torture. Robbie (Speedball) reveals it is for himself and assumes his new identity as Penance.

During the final battle of the pro- and anti-registration forces, several people are killed. Some days later, Sally Floyd and Ben Urich visit Captain America aboard The Raft. Both have quit their jobs. He expresses regret he didn't try for peaceful discussions earlier. Floyd derides him for his lack of knowledge of current American culture. The two reporters decide to form a news outlet called 'Frontlines'. They meet with Iron Man. The duo believe that he has orchestrated much of the preceding events for the purposes of registration, because he believed the alternative would be far worse. Angered, Iron Man kicks them out of his office.

Notes
Each issue from #1 to #9 concludes with a short story comparing the events of Civil War to real historical conflicts. Each piece is accompanied by portions of a relevant text.
Issue 1 - Anonymous poem from Poston War Relocation Center. Compares with Spider-Man web-swinging to the Statue of Liberty whilst considering his identity reveal decision.
Issue 2 - Text by Plutarch. Compares Iron Man's arrest of Prodigy with Julius Caesar crossing the Rubicon.
Issue 3 - Futility by Wilfred Owen.
Issue 4 - Goodnight Saigon by Billy Joel. Compares an American action against Viet Cong with the government ambush of the rebels earlier in the issue.
Issue 5 - Letters from two brothers during the American Civil War, James and Alexander Campbell. They fought in a battle, each on opposing sides. They later find out they had fought each other.  Compares the event to Iron Man and Spider-Man attacking a group of unregistered heroes that were resisting arrest.
Issue 6 - High Flight by John Gillespie Magee. Compares the Battle of Britain to aerial conflict in the story.
Issue 7 - An epigraph by A. E. Housman, taken from his collection More Poems, comparing the dead of the Somme offensive to the Atlanteans killed by the Green Goblin.
Issue 8 - Into Battle by Julian Grenfell comparing the royalists and the Parliamentarists in the English Civil War of 1642 to the Pro-Registration and Anti-Registration groups.

Front Line limited series tie ins were also used for World War Hulk (World War Hulk: Front Line), Secret Invasion (Secret Invasion: Front Line) and Siege (Siege: Embedded).

Collected editions

See also
 Civil War II

References

2006 comics debuts
2007 comics endings
Comics set in New York City
Marvel Comics limited series